Beat Pyramid is the debut studio album by British art rock band These New Puritans. It was released on 28 January 2008 in the United Kingdom through Angular and Domino and on 18 March 2008 in the United States through Domino. The album was recorded in London and Paris during 2007 and was produced by Gareth Jones in London.  The double A-side "Numbers/Colours", "Elvis" and "Swords of Truth" were released as singles.

Lyricist and primary composer Jack Barnett has claimed that hip-hop group Wu-Tang Clan were among the influences for the album, along with electronic music from artists in the vein of Aphex Twin.

Origins and Recording 
These New Puritans' first release was the extended play Now Pluvial, which was a three track long record released in October 2006 through independent record label Angular Records.  Despite only being a limited release, the EP attracted good reception from Drowned in Sound, garnering a 9/10 review.

Promotion and Release

Track listing 
All songs written by Jack Barnett, unless otherwise stated.

Personnel 

Band
 Jack Barnett – vocals, guitar, laptop
 Thomas Hein – bass guitar, sampler, MIDI
 Sophie Sleigh-Johnson – keyboards
 George Barnett – drums, loops, contact mics

Additional musicians
 Justyna Borucka – vocals ("..ce I Will Say This Twice"; "I Will Say This Twi...")
 Killah Doku – guitar
 James Ford – guitar ("Costume"), keyboard ("Elvis")
 Thomas Jerome Seabrook – mixer, effects
 Gareth Jones – desk feedback

Production
 Gareth Jones – producer, mixing
 James Ford – tape recording ("Elvis")
 Jack Barnett – additional recording, additional editing
 DB Cooper – additional recording, additional editing
 Jeff Knowles – engineer (except "Navigate-Colours")
 Quentin Leuiller – engineer ("Navigate-Colours")
 James Aparicio – mix engineer

Artwork
 Matthew Cooper – design
 Elina Tsompanoglou – design
 George Barnett – design assistant
 Jack Barnett – design assistant

References 

These New Puritans albums
2008 debut albums
Domino Recording Company albums
Albums produced by Gareth Jones (music producer)
Angular Recording Corporation albums